"He Understands Me" is a song released in 1963 by Teresa Brewer. The song was a hit single for Johnny Tillotson in 1964, retitled "She Understands Me", and Bobby Vinton in 1966, retitled "Dum-De-Da".

Teresa Brewer version
Teresa Brewer released the original version of the song in 1963, as a single and on the album Terrific Teresa Brewer! On November 9, 1963, Brewer's version charted at No. 130 on Billboards Bubbling Under the Hot 100 and reached No. 45 on Cash Boxs "Looking Ahead" chart of singles with potential of entering the Cash Box Top 100.

Johnny Tillotson version

In 1964, Johnny Tillotson released a version of the song, retitled "She Understands Me", as a single and on the album She Understands Me. Tillotson's version spent 11 weeks on the Billboard Hot 100 chart, peaking at No. 31, while reaching No. 4 on Billboards Middle-Road Singles chart, No. 29 on the Cash Box Top 100, No. 25 on Canada's RPM "Top 40 & 5", and No. 5 in Malaysia.

Bobby Vinton version

In 1966, Bobby Vinton released a version of the song, retitled "Dum-De-Da", as a single. Vinton's version spent 6 weeks on the Billboard Hot 100 chart, peaking at No. 40, while reaching No. 24 on Billboards Middle-Road Singles chart, No. 32 on the Cash Box Top 100, No. 35 on Record Worlds "100 Top Pops", and No. 29 on Canada's RPM 100.

French adaptation
A French language adaptation, titled "Dum di la", with lyrics written by Georges Aber, was released in 1964 by Sylvie Vartan.  A track on the EP La plus belle pour aller danser, Vartan’s version reached No. 3 in Wallonia.

References

1963 songs
1963 singles
1964 singles
1966 singles
Teresa Brewer songs
Johnny Tillotson songs
Sylvie Vartan songs
Bobby Vinton songs
Songs written by Merle Kilgore
Songs written by Margie Singleton
Philips Records singles
MGM Records singles
Epic Records singles